Banbury Hillfort, or Banbury Hill Camp, is an Iron Age hillfort, about  south of Sturminster Newton and  north-west of the village of Okeford Fitzpaine in Dorset, England.

It is a Scheduled Ancient Monument.

Description
The site has been affected in the past by ploughing.

There are no traces of remains in the interior.

The rampart (ascertained as a result of excavation in 1986 of a trench for a water pipe) has been found to be of local limestone, with some fragments of flint and chert.

See also
 Hillforts in Britain

References

Hill forts in Dorset
Scheduled monuments in Dorset